Eva Diego Cruz (born 2 May 1975) is a Mexican politician affiliated with the PRD. She served as a federal deputy in the LXII Legislature of the Mexican Congress representing Oaxaca, and previously served in the Congress of Oaxaca.

References

1975 births
Living people
Politicians from Veracruz
Women members of the Chamber of Deputies (Mexico)
Party of the Democratic Revolution politicians
21st-century Mexican politicians
21st-century Mexican women politicians
Benito Juárez Autonomous University of Oaxaca alumni
Members of the Congress of Oaxaca
People from Córdoba, Veracruz
Deputies of the LXII Legislature of Mexico
Members of the Chamber of Deputies (Mexico) for Oaxaca